Calabresi is an Italian surname (meaning "Calabrese, Calabrian, from Calabria", plural masculine) may refer to

 Enrica Calabresi (1891–1944), Italian zoologist, herpetologist, and entomologist
 Guido Calabresi (born 1932), Italian American legal scholar and judge 
 Luigi Calabresi (1937–1972), Italian police officer
 Peter Calabresi, American neurologist
 Steven G. Calabresi, American lawyer

See also 
 Calabrese (surname)
 Calabresella
 Calabrian (disambiguation)

Italian-language surnames
Italian toponymic surnames
Ethnonymic surnames